Phil Chambers  (June 16, 1916 – January 16, 1993) was an American actor.

Born in Los Angeles, California, Phil Chambers was known for his role as Sergeant Myles Magruder in the television series The Gray Ghost.

Filmography

Film

1953: Trouble Along the Way – Bishop (uncredited)
1953: Code Two – Police First Sergeant (uncredited)
1953: Law and Order – High Light Lonas (uncredited)
1953: Powder River – Man with Glasses (uncredited)
1953: Affair with a Stranger – Poker Player (uncredited)
1953: The Man from the Alamo – (uncredited)
1953: The Big Heat – Hettrick (uncredited)
1953: Three Lives (Short)
1953: Tumbleweed – Trapper Ross
1954: Executive Suite – Toll Booth Attendant (uncredited)
1954: Overland Pacific – Weeks (uncredited)
1954: Riding Shotgun – Stage Station Manager (uncredited)
1954: Drums Across the River – Dave (uncredited)
1954: Pushover – Detective Briggs (uncredited)
1954: Rogue Cop – Det. Dirksen (uncredited)
1954: The Bounty Hunter – Ed
1954: Ricochet Romance – Mr. Daniels
1955: Rage at Dawn – Deputy Cortright (uncredited)
1955: Run for Cover – Morgan's Partner in Bank Robbery (uncredited)
1955: Foxfire – Mr. Riley (uncredited)
1955: It's a Dog's Life – Carney (uncredited)
1956: Backlash – Deputy Sheriff Dobbs
1956: A Day of Fury – Burson
1956: The Mole People – Dr. Paul Stuart
1957: Drango – Luke
1957: Will Success Spoil Rock Hunter? – Mailman (uncredited)
1957: Man on Fire – Roberts (uncredited)
1957: Raintree County – Starter (uncredited)
1959: Good Day for a Hanging – Deputy William Avery
1959: A Summer Place – Sheriff (uncredited)
1962: Six Black Horses – Undertaker
1963: For Love or Money – Captain of Crab Boat (uncredited)
1967: Warning Shot – Gardener (uncredited)

Television
1957–1958: The Gray Ghost – Sgt. Myles Magruder
1959: Bat Masterson – Town Sheriff
1962–1969: Bonanza – 15 episodes as Store Owner / Webster / Wooley / Abner / Shopkeeper / Seth Hubbell / Sam / Anderson / Mr. Tindle / Abe / Mr. Amos – Store Owner / Assay Clerk / Austin / Dick Thompson
1963: The Twilight Zone (Episode: "The New Exhibit") – Gas Man
1973: Kung Fu – Mackey
1974: The Strange and Deadly Occurrence (TV Movie) – Coroner
1975: Gunsmoke – Farmer / Stage Driver / Beckwith / Shotgun / 2nd Stage Man / Ned Shields / Hugo
1979: The Rockford Files – Old Man
1979: B. J. and the Bear – Jack Peterson
1981: Little House on the Prairie – Mr. Matlockb

References 
50 Years of the Television Western Escrito por Ronald Jackson, Doug Abbott
http://www.imdb.com/name/nm0150418/

External links
 

American male film actors
American male television actors
20th-century American male actors
1916 births
1993 deaths